Tractebel is a Belgian subsidiary which provides consultancy and engineering services in the energy, water, nuclear and infrastructure sectors for the ENGIE group, as well as for national and international institutions and customers in the public and private markets.

Tractebel has acquired Coyne & Bellier in 1976, IMDC in 1982, Technum in 1995, Leme Engenharia in 2000, Lamheyer International in 2014, GWK Consult & RED in 2016, ENGIE Laborelec in 2017 and DOC Offshore and Overdick in 2018.

History

Four companies
Tractebel traces its beginning to Gaz Belge, a holding company founded in 1862 to provide gas lighting and heating, and to three other  enterprises specialized in trams, railways and electricity: Société Générale de Chemins de Fer Economiques (1880), Compagnie Mutuelle de Tramways and Société Générale Belge d'Entreprises Electriques (both in 1895).  By 1901, all four companies had set up design offices,  carrying out investment projects,  and managing the resulting operations. These included power supply and public transport in Belgium; the first electric trams in Damascus, Syria and Odessa, Ukraine; railways in Egypt; and power stations in Argentina.

Electrobel and Tractionel
In 1929, three of the companies merged to form the engineering consultancy Electrobel, which constructed several Belgian power plants. The fourth, 'Mutuelle des Tramways' changed its name to 'Traction & Electricité' and later to 'Tractionel'. The two entities established their core business with projects such as the extension and upgrade of the Belgian power grid after the Second World War and the installation of Belgium’s nuclear power plants from 1969. More infrastructures; pipelines, dams, hydropower stations and complex buildings were also commissioned locally and abroad. In 1977, Coyne et Bellier (France), known for hydroelectric dams, joined the Electrobel group.

Finally after decades of collaboration on many projects Electrobel and Tractionel merged in 1986, forming Tractebel, along with a new engineering division: Tractebel Engineering.  The new division soon established its own divisions and a worldwide network of affiliates, acquiring Cheming (Czech Republic) in 1992 and founding Citec (Poland) in 1993. The group’s Flemish subsidiaries merged under the name of Technum in 1995. Trapec (Romania) joined in 1997,  Leme (Brazil) in 2000,  the same year that Tractebel Engineering Italy and TECPL in India were set up.

Suez
In 2003, Tractebel merged with Société Générale de Belgique. The company created was SUEZ-Tractebel, a wholly owned subsidiary of SUEZ. In 2008, SUEZ itself  merged with Gaz de France to form GDF SUEZ  and Tractebel Engineering became the engineering consultancy for the world’s No.1 independent energy group.

In 2009, Tractebel Engineering became a legal entity and a fully fledged independent company within the GDF SUEZ Energy Services business unit of GDF SUEZ.

ENGIE

On 24 April 2015, GDF Suez announced that it was changing its name to "ENGIE", in Belgium, the name change took place in 2016. To make them more readable, the brands of the ENGIE Group will be declined and Tractebel Engineering will become Tractebel. ENGIE Group and Laborelec will be called ENGIE Lab.

Management
 Chairman: Georges Cornet
 Chief Executive Officer: Philippe Van Troeye

Location

Belgium
 Tractebel: headquarters

Brazil
 Leme
Leme Engenharia, established in 1965, is a Brazilian company that provides independent Consulting Engineering services for a broad range of economic sectors, notably the infrastructure segment.

It designs and manages projects of all sizes and its clients include private and public companies, as well as Federal, State and Municipal governmental agencies, both within and outside Brazil.

Czech Republic
 Tractebel Engineering, Czech Republic
The company was founded in 1952. In 1992 it became a fully owned and integrated member of the world wide net of TRACTEBEL ENGINEERING, an engineering arm of SUEZ ENERGY SERVICES (SES) and GDF SUEZ group.

France
 Tractebel Engineering, France
 Coyne et Bellier

India
 Tractebel Engineering Pvt.Ltd
Tractebel Engineering, India started its operations in the year 2000 as a wholly owned subsidiary of Tractebel Engineering S.A.

Italy
 Tractebel Engineering
On the 20th of March 2000 Tractebel establishes an Italian engineering company in Rome. At the end of 2006, the Suez Tractebel Italian Branch is established adopting the logo of Tractebel Engineering Suez. On 2 February 2009 the Italian Branch of Suez Tractebel S.A. becomes operative as Tractebel Engineering S.p.A. Now employs approximately 65 people.

Poland
 Tractebel Engineering, Poland
Tractebel Engineering, Poland started off as CITEC (under the name "CITEC Polska") which was established in 1993 as limited liability Company after one year of operation of branch office of CITEC Belgium and since then has grown very rapidly, establishing its present position as one of the largest Polish consulting companies. In 1996 the shareholders of CITEC decided to transfer the company into joined stock CITEC S.A. In 2009, CITEC adopted the name and branding of Tractebel Engineering.

Romania
 Tractebel Engineering, Romania
Formerly known as Trapec which was set up in 1997, as a purely private stock company for engineering activities. The company is nowadays owned 100% by GDF Suez, through Tractebel Engineering. Tractebel Engineering, Romania is active in energy engineering (60%) and in infrastructure (40%). Now employs 211 engineers.

United Arab Emirates
 Dubai

Thailand
 Tractebel Engineering, Thailand
Established in 2010, Tractebel Engineering Thailand (Bangkok office) focuses on the development of projects in the ASEAN (The Association of Southeast Asian Nations) region.

Notes

Engineering companies of Belgium
Companies based in Brussels
Engie
Société Générale de Belgique